Shane Yost is a retired Australian professional vert skater and was the 2000 ASA number one ranked vert skater in the world. He was the first vert skater to land a switch 1080 and the first skater to land a frontside 1260. Yost revolutionized the world of inline skating with his clean style and incredible flair.

Best Tricks Fakie 1080, First person to ever land a frontside 1260 in competition, Frontside Double 360 Garfunkel, First person to land a Fakie Garfunkel.

Vert Competitions 
2015 Australian Rolling Open, Canberra, ACT - Vert: Gold Medalist
2014 Australian Rolling Open, Geelong, VIC - Vert: Gold Medalist
2008 LG Action Sports World Championships, Seattle, WA - Vert: Silver Medalist
2008 Asian X Games, Shanghai - Vert: 3rd
2007 LG Action Sports World Championships, Dallas, TX - Vert: Silver Medalist
2007 Action Sports World Tour, San Diego, CA - Vert: 4th
2007 Asian X Games, Shanghai - Vert: 2nd
2007 Vodafone X-Air, Wellington, New Zealand - Vert: 2nd
2006 LG Action Sports World Championships, Dallas, TX - Vert: 3rd
2006 LG Action Sports World Tour, Paris, France - Vert: 2nd
2006 LG Action Sports World Tour, Berlin, Germany - Vert: 1st
2006 LG Action Sports World Tour, Birmingham, England - Vert: 1st
2006 LG Action Sports World Tour, Amsterdam, Netherlands - Vert: 2nd
2006 Action Sports World Tour, Richmond, VA - Vert: 4th
LG Action Sports World Championship, Manchester, England - Vert: 3rd
LG Action Sports World Tour, Moscow, Russia - Vert: 3rd
2003 ASA Pro Tour, Cleveland, OH: 6th
2003 ASA Pro Tour, Milwaukee, WI: 2nd
2003 ASA Pro Tour, Cincinnati, OH: 2nd
2003 ASA Pro Tour, Los Angeles, CA: 2nd
2003 World X Games: 3rd
2002 ASA World Championships: 2nd
2002 ASA Pro Tour, Baltimore, MD: 2nd
2002 Gravity Games: 3rd
2002 ASA Pro Tour, San Diego, CA: 4th
2002 ASA Pro Tour, Cincinnati, OH: 3rd
2001 X Games - Vert: Bronze Medalist

References

External links
actionsportstour.com
rollerblading.com.au
skatelog.com
grindtv.com
asaentertainment.com

1977 births
Living people
Australian skateboarders
Vert skaters
Sportspeople from Launceston, Tasmania
Sportsmen from Tasmania
X Games athletes